Bahra University is a private university located in Waknaghat, Solan district, Himachal Pradesh, India. The university was established in 2011 by the Rayat-Bahra Group (registered as Bahra Educational and Charitable Society) through the Bahra University (Establishment and Regulation) Act, 2010. The Rayat-Bahra Group also established Rayat Bahra University and other education institutes including Rayat Institute of Engineering & Information Technology.

Campus
The university is set up on a  residential campus. Apart from teaching facilities the campus holds a hostel, a medical centre, a gym, a bank and a mess.

Schools
The university has the following seven schools:
 School of Engineering
 School of Management 
 School of Law
 School of Pharmaceutical Science
 School of Physiotherapy 
 School of Hospitality and Tourism
 School of Basic Sciences

Approval
Like all universities in India, Bahra University is recognised by the University Grants Commission (UGC), which has also sent an expert committee. The programmes by the School of Law are approved by the Bar Council of India (BCI). The School of Pharmaceutical Science is approved by the Pharmacy Council of India (PCI).

References

External links

Education in Solan district
Universities in Himachal Pradesh
Educational institutions established in 2011
2011 establishments in Himachal Pradesh
Private universities in India